Fuel Venture Capital is a Miami, FL based venture capital firm that invests in seed-stage, early-stage, and later-stage companies.

Overview 
Fuel Venture Capital was founded in 2017 in Miami by former Merrill Lynch executive Jeff Ransdell. Ransdell is the founder and Managing Director. The company opened a new office and headquarters in Coconut Grove, FL in 2021.

In 2020 Fuel Venture Capital and Europe based IDC Ventures entered into a co-investing partnership.

In 2021, Fuel Venture Capital co-led RecargaPay’s Series C, led the investment round for CookUnity, and fintech startup Curve. In December 2021 it lead a $200 million funding round for Tradeshift alongside IDC Ventures and LUN Partners.

Fuel Venture Capital led a $20 million Series B financing round for Taxfyle in February of 2022 and a $19 million Series A funding round for NovoPayment, a Banking-as-a-Service (BaaS) platform in April 2022.

In 2021, Fuel Venture Capital portfolio company Terran Orbital went public via a $1.58 billion SPAC merger.

References 

Venture capital firms